Greenhills Beach is a beachside suburb, in southern Sydney, in the state of New South Wales, Australia in the local government area of Sutherland Shire. Nearby are countless bike tracks, Cronulla Sand Dunes, Greenhills Beach and Wanda Park.

History
Formerly part of Kurnell, Greenhills Beach was designated a suburb in 2011 following the approval of new residential development, in the locality known as Green Hills.

References

Suburbs of Sydney
Sutherland Shire